Henk van Schaik (born 20 January 1998) is a Dutch professional footballer who plays for German club SV Eintracht Trier 05, as a defender.

Career
Born in Leiden, van Schaik spent time with Quick Boys, ADO Den Haag and Twente before signing for Scottish club Livingston in October 2018.

He made his senior debut on 11 November 2018, in the Scottish Premiership, appearing as a 90th-minute substitute in a 0–0 draw at home to Celtic. Van Schaik joined Scottish League One side Dumbarton on loan in January 2019.

He then moved to Greenock Morton for a nominal fee on 26 July 2019, however, he subsequently left the club only one month later on 28 August 2019 when his contract was terminated by mutual consent.

In January 2020, van Schaik joined Almere City FC, where he played for the club's U21/Jong team. He made three appearances for the team in the Derde Divisie, before moving to Germany and joining Oberliga Rheinland-Pfalz/Saar club SV Eintracht Trier 05, signing on 7 August 2020 until the summer 2022.

References

1998 births
Living people
Dutch footballers
Dutch expatriate footballers
Quick Boys players
ADO Den Haag players
FC Twente players
Livingston F.C. players
Dumbarton F.C. players
Greenock Morton F.C. players
Almere City FC players
SV Eintracht Trier 05 players
Scottish Professional Football League players
Derde Divisie players
Oberliga (football) players
Association football defenders
Footballers from Leiden
Dutch expatriate sportspeople in Scotland
Dutch expatriate sportspeople in Germany
Expatriate footballers in Scotland
Expatriate footballers in Germany
Jong FC Twente players